Dariapur or Dwariapur may refer to one of the following places:
 Dariapur community development block, a block in Saran district, Bihar
 Dariapur (Ahmedabad), a locality in Central Ahmedabad 
 Dariapur, Malda, a village in the Indian state of West Bengal
 Dwariapur, a village in southwestern Bangladesh
 Dwariapur, Bardhaman, a village in the Indian state of West Bengal
 Dariapur, Purba Medinipur, a village in the Indian state of West Bengal